Władysław Zieliński (born 24 July 1935) was a Polish sprint canoeist who competed in the 1960s. Competing in three Summer Olympics, he won a bronze medal in the K-2 1000 m event at Rome in 1960.

Zieliński also won a gold in the K-2 500 m event at the 1958 ICF Canoe Sprint World Championships in Prague.

References

Sports-reference.com profile

1935 births
Canoeists at the 1960 Summer Olympics
Canoeists at the 1964 Summer Olympics
Canoeists at the 1968 Summer Olympics
Living people
Olympic canoeists of Poland
Olympic bronze medalists for Poland
Polish male canoeists
Olympic medalists in canoeing
Sportspeople from Warsaw
ICF Canoe Sprint World Championships medalists in kayak
Medalists at the 1960 Summer Olympics